The Men's team sabre event of the 2016 World Fencing Championships was held from 25 to 27 April 2016.

Medalists

Results

Championship bracket

5–8th place bracket

9–16th place bracket

13–16th place bracket

Final ranking

References
Bracket

2016 World Fencing Championships